Queensland Inland Freight Route is a proposal to upgrade the existing highways from  to  in Queensland, Australia. It would be a quality two-lane alternative freight route to the Bruce Highway.

Funding and program status
The estimated total cost in 2020 was $1.0 billion. The project was announced in October 2020 with an initial funding of $400 million from the Federal Government and $200 million from the Queensland Government. In the 2021 Budget the Queensland Government indicated that half of its funding had been allocated to a future priorities funding commitment. The project is at the detailed planning stage. Infrastructure Australia has set the project status as long-term (10 to 20 years).

Type of work
Works to be undertaken would include pavement straightening, road widening, new alignments, overtaking lanes and new or upgraded bridges.

Proposed route

References 

Roads in Queensland
Proposed roads in Australia